Kasteli Airport  is a military airport located  south-east of Heraklion, in Kasteli on the Greek island of Crete. The airport is used by F-16 Fighting Falcon fighter aircraft of the Hellenic Air Force's 133 Combat Group. The Ariadne Airport Group consortium, consisting of the GEK Terna in partnership with the Indian GMR Group has been selected to develop, operate and manage a new international airport on this site as a replacement for the existing Heraklion International Airport. The new Kasteli International Airport is due to open by 2025.

Airport expansion
It is planned that the new airport will be situated on the southwestern side of Kasteli Hellenic Air Force Base, from which the air force currently operates F-16 Fighting Falcon jet fighters.
The idea was first proposed in 1986 by then-Prime Minister Andreas Papandreou. The project has officially entered the implementation phase, and tenders have been invited. The new airport was planned to become operational in 2014. The existing airport at Heraklion will be closed and an area of  there will be returned to local communities for a large urban regeneration plan.

The creation of the new airport will require new road, water and sanitation works, as well as the transfer of settlements located within the proposed runway zone (Archangelos, Roussochoria). The construction of a  road will connect the airport with Motorway 90 (A90) along the north coast of Crete, in the neighbourhood of Chersonissos. Complaints have been filed for lack of a new road linking the new airport to the south coast of Crete.

An additional area of 22 hectares (54 acres) is reserved for commercial activity south-west of the new airport. This is a very large project with a budget of €1.2 billion for construction costs alone, and together with purchase costs including loans and other expenses, will reach €1.5 billion.

Initially, four candidates had appeared for the Kasteli airport construction and management project, from Greece, China, France and Spain.
China State Construction Engineering Corp. with the firm Archirodon and Zürich Airport.
Aktor is in a second consortium with France-based Vinci.
J&P Avax teamed up with Bouygues and Aéroports de Paris.
GEK Terna in partnership, initially, with the Spanish Grupo ACS and later with Indian GMR Airports.

However, the Ariadne Airport Group consortium was declared the provisional winner of the international tender in May 2017. Ariadne is a joint venture formed by Greece-based Terna and New Delhi-headquartered GMR Airports. According to the Greek Secretary General of the Ministry of Infrastructure and Transport, Mr. Giorgos Dedes, €10 million have been approved for expropriations and the contract for the airport has been approved by the Court of Auditors, so that infrastructure works can begin in January 2019, even if there are great concerns about the environmental pollution from airplane fumes to the underground water deposits that provide water to 1/4 of the city of Heraklion. On February 21, 2019, the Ministry of Infrastructure and Transport signed a concession allowing the Greek-Indian Ariadne Airport Group consortium to build the airport. The concession needs clearance from Parliament and competition authorities before construction begins. In May 2019, the Parliament approved by a wide majority the necessary legislation, ratifying the concessions contract.

Construction
The construction phase of the airport commenced in February 2020 after Greek Prime Minister Kyriakos Mitsotakis laid the foundation stone. Under the concession agreement, the construction of the airport is set to last a total of 60 months (i.e., 5 years) until 2025.

See also
List of airports in Crete

References

Airports in Greece
Buildings and structures in Heraklion (regional unit)
1940 establishments in Greece
Hellenic Air Force bases
Airports established in 1940
Airports in Crete